Kingi Te Ahoaho Tahiwi  (1883–1948) was a notable New Zealand teacher, interpreter, translator, rugby official and musician.

Personal life 
Tahiwi was born in Ōtaki, New Zealand, in 1883. He was of Māori descent and affiliated to the Ngāti Raukawa, Ngāti Whakaue and Te Arawa iwi. His father was Rawiri Rota Tahiwi of Ngati Ruakawa and he was related to the Ngati Whakaue section of Te Arawa through his maternal line. Pirimi Pererika Tahiwi was one of his younger brothers.  He was educated at Otaki and Te Aute college, where he later became an assistant master.

Career 
He was employed  by the Department of Maori Affairs from 1915 until his death. He chaired the executive of the Ngati Poneke Maori Association and also of both the Poneke tribal and executive committees

Sporting interests 
In 1926 Tahiwi became the secretary of the Maori Rugby Advisory Board. From 1927 until his death he was the Board's representative on the executive of the New Zealand Rugby Union. His was also involved with administration of cricket, hockey and athletics and the New Zealand Maori Lawn Tennis Association.

Honours and Awards 
In the 1946 New Year Honours, Tahiwi was appointed an Officer of the Order of the British Empire for services in connection with the organisation of the Māori war effort.

Death 
Tahiwi died on 20 December 1948 in Wellington.

References

1883 births
1948 deaths
Interpreters
20th-century translators
New Zealand schoolteachers
New Zealand Māori schoolteachers
New Zealand Māori musicians
Ngāti Raukawa people
Ngāti Whakaue people
Te Arawa people
People from Ōtaki, New Zealand
New Zealand Officers of the Order of the British Empire